Wagenfeld is a municipality in the district of Diepholz, Lower Saxony, Germany. It is situated approximately 15 km east of Diepholz, and 40 km northwest of Minden.

References

Diepholz (district)